David Wang is a "jail break" developer and mobile phone hacker who won the Apple phone hacking competition and hacked the iPhone to use as an Android apps platform.

References

Date of birth missing (living people)
People from Portland, Oregon
People associated with computer security
Living people
Year of birth missing (living people)